The 1990 Brent Council election took place on 3 May 1990 to elect members of Brent London Borough Council in London, England. The whole council was up for election and the council went in no overall control.

References

1990
1990 London Borough council elections